Brevibacterium limosum is a bacterium from the genus of Brevibacterium which has been isolated from ocean sediments.

References

Micrococcales
Bacteria described in 2022